The 2010 Kansas State Wildcats football team (variously "Kansas State", "KSU", or "K-State") represented Kansas State University in the 2010 NCAA Division I FBS football season. The Wildcats played their home games at Bill Snyder Family Football Stadium, in Manhattan, Kansas as they have done since 1968. It was the 115th season in school history. They were members of the Big 12 Conference in the north division. They finished the season 7–6, 3–5 in Big 12 play and were invited to the Pinstripe Bowl where they were defeated by Syracuse 34–36.

Schedule

Rankings

Game summaries

UCLA

Daniel Thomas ran for 234 yards and two touchdowns and the Wildcats won their 21st season opener in a row.  Carson Coffman threw 16 times, completing 11 passing and had just 66 yards passing.  William Powell added 72 yards on just 6 carries.  K-State set a home opener record with an attendance of 51,059.

Missouri State

Carson Coffman threw three touchdown passes and Daniel Thomas ran for 137 yards.  The Wildcats had 493 yards of total offense.

Iowa State

The Wildcats were favored by 4.

Central Florida

The Wildcats were favored by 7.

Nebraska

The Cornhuskers were favored by 12.

Kansas

For the second consecutive week the Wildcats played a Thursday night game. This game was against the rival Kansas Jayhawks for the Governors Cup. Kansas State scored first on a Josh Cherry field goal in the first quarter. During the second quarter Kansas State scored 4 touchdowns the first 2 coming from QB Carson Coffman runs, the third coming from a Daniel Thomas rush, and the fourth a reception by Travis Tannahill. In the third quarter the Wildcats scored three more touchdowns. The first coming on a pass to Andre McDonald from Carson Coffman, the second coming on a Stephen Harrison 85 yard fumble return, and the third coming on a Carson Coffman run. In the fourth quarter the Jayhawks scored on an Angus Quigly run. The Wildcats scored once more on a Colin Klein 51 yard run. The final score was K-State 59 KU 7. Carson Coffman went an impressive 15 for 16 for 184 yards and 2 touchdown passes in addition he also had 91 yards on the ground and 3 more touchdowns. Daniel Thomas had 91 yards and 1 touchdown. This was the largest margin of victory for either team since 2002 when K-State won 64–0. This loss is tied for the worst loss since KU lost to Texas 66–14 in 2005. In addition this was coach Bill Snyder's 14th win in the last 15 games against Kansas.

Baylor

The Bears were favored by 6.  With the win over BCS #22 Kansas State, Baylor became bowl-eligible for the first time in Big 12 history.

Oklahoma State

The Cowboys were favored by 5.

Texas

The Longhorns were favored by 6.

Kansas State, with Collin Klein starting for the injured Carson Coffman, went on to win 39–14. Entering the fourth quarter Kansas State was leading 39–0. Texas quarterback Garret Gilbert had 272 passing yards, 1 passing touchdown and 93 yards rushing, in addition to 5 interceptions. Kansas State quarterback Collin Klein had 9 passing yards on 4 attempts, 127 rushing yards and 2 rushing touchdowns. Kansas State running back Daniel Thomas had 106 rushing yards and 2 rushing touchdowns. Kansas State defensive backs Ty Zimmerman and Tyson Hartman both had 2 Garret Gilbert interceptions, while Kansas State defensive back Stephen Harrison also had 1 interception. This was the Wildcats' third straight win over the Longhorns.

Missouri

Colorado

North Texas

Pinstripe Bowl

The 2010 Pinstripe Bowl was played at Yankee Stadium in Bronx, New York on December 30, 2010.  Syracuse won by a final score 36–34.

With 1:13 left in the game, Kansas State's Adrian Hilburn scored a 30-yard touchdown to pull KSU within two points of a tie.  Following the score, Hilburn made a military hand salute toward the crowd and was penalized for unsportsmanlike conduct.  Because of the 15-yard penalty, Kansas State had to attempt a two-point conversion from the 17-yard line.  The conversion failed, accounting for the margin in the final score.  The call was considered highly controversial, and according to ESPN determined the outcome of the game.  Due to the impact from this call, the NCAA chose in the next year's rule changes to not penalize celebrating in general but to penalize only taunting.  The call was called "one of the most infamous plays of the college football season in 2010" and was given the name "The Bronx Salute."  It later was used as an example of incorrect interpretation of the new celebration rules.

Roster

Coaching staff 
The following is a list of coaches at Kansas State for the 2010 season.

Recruiting
The following is a list of the recruits that are on the 2010 roster.

References

Kansas State
Kansas State Wildcats football seasons
Kansas State Wildcats football